Trifurcula serotinella is a moth of the family Nepticulidae. It was described by Gottlieb August Wilhelm Herrich-Schäffer in 1855. It is known from France, Germany, Austria, Switzerland, the Czech Republic and Romania.

References

Nepticulidae
Moths of Europe
Moths described in 1855